Tetraclita rubescens , the pink volcano barnacle, is a species of sessile barnacle in the family Tetraclitidae.

T. rubescens is a sessile barnacle with a diameter usually to 30 mm, rarely to 50 mm. Exoskeletal wall consists of four plates with no basal plate (all other local acorn barnacles have 6 plates). The shells of adults are pink to reddish and appear thatched, while the shells of (uneroded) juveniles are white (Morris et al. 1980).

Habitat and Geographic Range
Common in middle to low intertidal zones on rocks exposed to strong surf from Cape Mendocino, Northern California to Baja California (Carlton 2007).

Natural History

Thatched barnacles are usually found growing as solitary individuals rather than in aggregations, like acorn barnacles (Engle and Davis 1996). Thatched barnacles are brooders, and do not become reproductive until they are about 2 years old (18mm in diameter). In California, as many as 3 broods of 1,000-50,000 nauplius larvae (depending on parent size) can be released by an individual in one summer (Morris et al. 1980). Tetraclita rubescens may live as long as 15 years (Hines 1978). These barnacles are effective competitors for space, and may influence the distribution of mussels and other species (Foster et al. 1988). In the lower intertidal zone, individuals may grow large enough to avoid predation by sea stars and gastropods (Morris et al. 1980). Up until the 1990s the northern range limit was thought to be San Francisco; however; more recent studies have placed the northern limit several hundred kilometers farther north into Northern California (Connolly and Roughgarden 1998), possibly in response to global climate change (Dawson et al. 2010).

References

Tetraclita
Crustaceans described in 1854